Jorge Uauy (born 8 December 1944) is a Chilean former sports shooter. He competed in the skeet event at the 1972 Summer Olympics.

References

1944 births
Living people
Chilean male sport shooters
Olympic shooters of Chile
Shooters at the 1972 Summer Olympics
Place of birth missing (living people)
Pan American Games medalists in shooting
Pan American Games bronze medalists for Chile
Shooters at the 1971 Pan American Games
20th-century Chilean people